Dunphy is an Irish surname derived from Donohoe. It may refer to:

People

Chris Dunphy (born 1950), Football (Soccer) Chairman
Don Dunphy (1908–1998), American broadcaster
Éamon Dunphy (born 1945), Irish footballer and broadcaster
Fran Dunphy (born 1948), American basketball coach
Jack Dunphy (1914–1992), American author
Jerry Dunphy (1921–2002), American broadcaster
Jessica Dunphy (born 1984), American actress
Kristen Dunphy, Australian television screenwriter and producer
Melissa Dunphy (born 1980), Australian-American classical composer
Michelle Dunphy, American politician from Maine
Myles and Milo Dunphy (1928–1996), Australian conservationists
Nick Dunphy (born 1974), English footballer

Fictional characters

Claire Dunphy and Phil Dunphy, and other family members, on the American television series Modern Family
Dennis Dunphy, in Demolition Man (comics)
Timothy "Dildo" Dunphy, in the novel Outside Providence
Jackie Dunphy, in the film version of Outside Providence; see Ryan and Kyle Pepi

Surnames of British Isles origin